Kumai is a Japanese surname. Notable people with the surname include:

 Candice Kumai, American author and chef
, Japanese film director
, Japanese actor
, Japanese voice actress
, Japanese football player
, Japanese idol singer (Berryz Kobo)

Japanese-language surnames